This is a list of cathedrals in Slovenia. All are Roman Catholic.

See also
 Catholic Church in Slovenia
 List of cathedrals

External links
GCatholic.org Cathedrals in Slovenia

 List
Slovenia
Cathedrals
Cathedrals